Roy Wilson Beckett (20 March 1928 – 11 September 2008) was an English footballer who played in the Football League for Stoke City.

Career
Beckett was born in Stoke-on-Trent and played football with Milton Youth Club and Burslem Albion before joining Stoke City in 1950. He was used as a back-up player and in four seasons with the club he played in fifteen matches scoring once against Everton on 13 January 1951. After he left Stoke in 1954 he went on to play for Northwich Victoria.

Career statistics

References

English footballers
Stoke City F.C. players
Northwich Victoria F.C. players
English Football League players
1928 births
2008 deaths
Association football defenders